NGC 901 is an elliptical galaxy in the constellation Aries. It is estimated to be 441 million light years from the Milky Way and has a diameter of approximately 50,000 ly. NGC 901 was discovered on September 5, 1864 by Albert Marth.

See also 
 List of NGC objects (1–1000)

References

External links 
 

Aries (constellation)
0901
Elliptical galaxies
212967